The University Club of Washington, D.C., is an American private club in downtown Washington, D.C., United States.

History
Established in 1904 simply as the University Club, its first president was then Secretary of War and future United States President William Howard Taft.  In 1936, it merged with the Racquet Club of Washington, and moved to its current location at 1135 Sixteenth Street NW, approximately three blocks north of the White House.

During the Warren Court justices Earl Warren and Hugo Black would often use the Club's facilities to informally discuss and gather.

Reciprocity
The Club has reciprocal agreements for its members with approximately 200 other athletic, country, and city clubs around the United States and the world.

Athletics
The Club contains a health and fitness center including two international squash courts where it hosts the annual Mosquito Open.  The Tewaaraton Award was founded at the Club in 2000 and is presented annually to the NCAA Lacrosse player of the year. It is the lacrosse equivalent of football's Heisman Trophy. The trophy is presented jointly by The Tewaaraton Foundation and the University Club of Washington, D.C.. One trophy is presented to the top men's player, and one trophy is presented to the top women's player each year.

Notable members
Notable past and current Club members include former Speaker of the House Tip O'Neill, former President Richard Nixon, numerous Supreme Court Justices, former Homeland Security Secretary Tom Ridge, and former Secretary of Defense Donald Rumsfeld.

See also
 Cosmos Club
 List of American gentlemen's clubs
 Metropolitan Club (Washington, D.C.)
 Sixteenth Street Historic District

References

External links

University Club of Washington, DC

1904 establishments in Washington, D.C.
Clubhouses in Washington, D.C.
Gentlemen's clubs in the United States